College Park is a train station in College Park, Georgia, United States, serving the Red and Gold lines of the Metropolitan Atlanta Rapid Transit Authority (MARTA) rail system. It opened on June 18, 1988. This station mainly serves College Park and surrounding areas, including Morrow, Riverdale, Clayton County, and South Fulton.

An interesting feature of this station is that the platform is narrower at the north end and wider at the south end, presumably to allow room for the yard leads just south of the station. The narrowing of the platform is most apparent at the north end of the platform.

In 2013, College Station had 9,026 average weekday entries, passing up Lindbergh Center to become the third-busiest station, only behind the Airport and Five Points Stations.

History
College Park Station was opened on June 18, 1988, along with the Airport Station. The Airport Station was built 8 years earlier along with the airport terminal, but remained unconnected until College Park Station was built to connect the two.

Station layout
College Park Station has 1,883 daily parking spaces and 88 long-term parking spaces. MARTA Bus routes 82, 93, 172, and 180 can be accessed via the north bus bays and routes 89, 189, 195, and 196 via the south bus bays. The buses serve Camp Creek Parkway, Georgia International Convention Center, Old National Highway, Southlake Mall, South Fulton Park & Ride, Fairburn, Palmetto, Sylvan Hills, Union City, Clayton County and Riverdale.

Nearby landmarks & popular destinations
Downtown College Park
Georgia International Convention Center
Bill Evans Basefield and Bill Badgett Stadium
U.S. Federal Aviation Administration
Woodward Academy

References

External links

MARTA Station Page
Station Overview, including video tour
MARTA Guide

Gold Line (MARTA)
Red Line (MARTA)
Metropolitan Atlanta Rapid Transit Authority stations
Railway stations in the United States opened in 1988
Railway stations in Atlanta
1988 establishments in Georgia (U.S. state)